Heinrich Richter (1884–1981) was a German painter and art director. He designed the sets for more than a hundred films during his career.

Selected filmography
 The Confessions of the Green Mask (1916)
 The Sensational Trial (1923)
 Upstairs and Downstairs (1925)
 Semi-Silk (1925)
 Should We Be Silent? (1926)
 A Crazy Night (1927)
 One Plus One Equals Three (1927)
 Children's Souls Accuse You (1927)
 The Trousers (1927)
 The Girl with the Five Zeros (1927)
 When the Guard Marches (1928)
 The Prince of Rogues (1928)
 The House Without Men (1928)
 Master and Mistress (1928)
 Villa Falconieri (1928)
 Sinful and Sweet (1929)
 The Man Without Love  (1929)
 The Call of the North (1929)
 Daughter of the Regiment (1929)
 Come Back, All Is Forgiven (1929)
 Mischievous Miss (1930)
 Morals at Midnight (1930)
 The Man Who Murdered (1931)
 The Murderer Dimitri Karamazov (1931)
 A Woman Branded (1931)
 Durand Versus Durand (1931)
 Who Takes Love Seriously? (1931)
 Two in a Car (1932)
 The Eleven Schill Officers (1932)
 Death Over Shanghai (1932)
 The Sporck Battalion (1934)
 Every Day Isn't Sunday (1935)
 The Schimeck Family (1935)
 Fruit in the Neighbour's Garden (1935)
 Thunder, Lightning and Sunshine (1936)
 The Man Who Couldn't Say No (1938)
 Little County Court (1938)
 The Unfaithful Eckehart (1940)
 Passion (1940)

References

Bibliography 
 Soister, John T. Conrad Veidt on Screen: A Comprehensive Illustrated Filmography. McFarland, 2002.

External links

1884 births
1981 deaths
German art directors
20th-century German painters
20th-century German male artists
German male painters
Film people from Berlin